Estadio Christian Benítez Betancourt is a football stadium in Guayaquil, Ecuador. It was named after footballer Christian Benítez. Guayaquil City F.C. play their home games at the 10,152-capacity stadium.

References

Football venues in Ecuador
Football venues in Guayaquil
Multi-purpose stadiums in Ecuador
Estadio Christian Benítez Betancourt
Estadio Christian Benítez Betancourt